Synth is an action real-time strategy video game by Canadian developer Rhys Paul Hovey for Microsoft Windows. Synth is an abstract and procedurally generated 3D game, in which the graphics have an algorithmic C++ representation.

Gameplay
Synth is a strategic action game, in which the player must find an exit in a procedurally generated landscape. The player is equipped with a laser, bombs, and a device that acts as a vacuum or blower. The overall goal is to reach the highest level possible.

Synth uses C++ algorithms to generate the level's structure and graphics. Levels are seeded from four-letter words: for example, "BGNI" is the first level. As the game does not need to store pre-rendered textures and model data, only small filesizes are required.

Synths drum and bass synthesizer soundtrack dynamically changes during the game. The sounds were pre-composed by Hovey, but the player's controls are mapped to a loop-sequence remixer.

Development
Hovey cites the artwork of Roger Dean (who produced the covers for several Psygnosis titles), other Amiga graphics, and Pink Floyd as influences for Synths imagery.

Synth is currently only available as a game demo. Once a full version is ready, Hovey intends to acquire a digital distribution deal.

Critical reception
Todd Ciolek, an editor with Gamasutra made reference to the game's experimental design: "Rhys Paul Hovey’s SYNTH is an experimental game in many ways". Rock, Paper, Shotgun drew comparisons with the visuals of Darwinia and the procedural nature of .kkrieger. The graphics were described as fascinating: "a bizarre, mesmerizing cross between the deeply archaic and the thoroughly high-tech." ModDB reviewed version 0.909 and praised the game's concept, describing the visuals as "crazy 3D Geometry Wars on acid". Criticisms included the poor frame rate, incomplete Vista 64-bit support and lack of a windowed mode.

In November 2010, SYNTH:Electropix 64 bit version 1.505, won 1st place in the Intel corporation's "Level up" 2010 game demo contest, in the "Best game for a desktop" category. Hovey used the user name Paul Richard.

See also
Procedural generation
Psychedelic art

References

External links 
Synth at ModDB
Game Review (Moddb Podcast) 

2009 video games
Art games
Computer art
Digital art
Contemporary art
Video games developed in Canada
Video games using procedural generation
Windows games
Windows-only games
Action video games
Real-time strategy video games
Single-player video games